Judge Jenkins may refer to:

Bruce Sterling Jenkins (born 1927), judge of the United States District Court for the District of Utah
James Graham Jenkins (1834–1921), judge of the United States Court of Appeals for the Seventh Circuit
John J. Jenkins (1843–1911), judge of the United States District Court for the District of Puerto Rico
Martin Jenkins (born 1953), judge of the United States District Court for the Northern District of California, before serving on the Supreme Court of California

See also
Justice Jenkins (disambiguation)